The 12th Television State Awards festival (Sinhala: 12 වැනි රූපවාහිනී රාජ්‍ය සම්මාන උලෙළ), was held to honor the television programs of 2014 Sinhala television on December 28, 2015, at the Nelum Pokuna Mahinda Rajapaksa Theatre, Colombo 07, Sri Lanka. The event was organized by the Ministry of Culture and the Arts, State Television Advisory Council and Arts Council of Sri Lanka. His Excellency The President of Sri Lanka Maithripala Sirisena was the chief guest. A total of were received for the Best Sinhala and Tamil Artists in 35 categories.

At the award ceremony, veteran broadcaster Shan Wickremesinghe received the Lifetime Achievement Award. Meanwhile, the 9th issue of the Rupavahini Survey Book for the Rupavahini State Awards was also launched.

Awards

Media Section

Television Serial Section

See also
 14th Sri Lankan Television State Awards

References

Sri Lankan Television State Awards
Sri Lankan Television State Awards